Lesnoy is a rural locality (a settlement) in Kurshsky Rural Okrug of Zelenogradsky District of Kaliningrad Oblast, Russia. Population: 425 (2011 est.). It is located on the Curonian Spit.

References

Rural localities in Kaliningrad Oblast
Populated coastal places in Russia
Zelenogradsky District